Kevin Zefi (born 11 February 2005) is an Irish professional footballer who plays as a winger for Serie A club Inter Milan.

Early and personal life
Zefi was born in Dublin and grew up in the Clonsilla area. He attended Luttrellstown Community College. He is of Albanian descent.

Club career
Zefi began his career with Shamrock Rovers. In 2020 he was linked with a transfer away from the club, with Italian club Inter Milan and Dutch club PSV said to be interested.

He began his senior career with Shamrock Rovers II in the League of Ireland First Division in the 2020 season, becoming the youngest ever scorer in the League of Ireland, at the age of 15 years 206 days. He had also been Shamrock Rovers II's youngest ever player, until that record was beaten by 14-year-old Sam Curtis in October 2020.

He moved to Italian club Inter Milan in August 2021. In December 2021 he scored a hat-trick for Inter's youth team.

In February 2022 he spoke positively about his move to Italy, encouraging other young Irish players to do the same.

International career
Zefi has played for the Republic of Ireland at under-15, under-17 and under-19 level.

References

2005 births
Living people
Irish people of Albanian descent
Republic of Ireland association footballers
Association football wingers
Republic of Ireland youth international footballers
League of Ireland players
Shamrock Rovers F.C. players
Inter Milan players
Republic of Ireland expatriate association footballers
Irish expatriate sportspeople in Italy
Expatriate footballers in Italy